TOZ may refer to:

Companies and organizations
 Association for Joint Cultivation of Land or TOZ, a form of agricultural cooperative in early Soviet Union (1918–1938)
 TOZ Penkala, a company from Zagreb, Croatia
 TOZ rifle (Tulsky Oruzheyny Zavod), manufactured by Russian Tula Arms Plant, founded by Tsar Peter I of Russia
 , Association of the Protection of Animals in Poland

Entertainment
 "A Toz", a humorous French novelty rap song by the duo Farid & Oussama featuring Aymane Serhani
 FC Arsenal Tula or TOZ Tula, a Russian football team from Tula, Russia
 Tonhalle-Orchester Zürich, a Swiss symphony orchestra based in Zürich, Switzerland
 Toz (film), a 2005 Turkish short film

Other